Chromobox protein homolog 3 is a protein that is encoded by the CBX3 gene in humans.

At the nuclear envelope, the nuclear lamina and heterochromatin are adjacent to the inner nuclear membrane. The protein encoded by this gene binds DNA and is a component of heterochromatin. This protein also can bind lamin B receptor, an integral membrane protein found in the inner nuclear membrane. The dual binding functions of the encoded protein may explain the association of heterochromatin with the inner nuclear membrane. Two transcript variants encoding the same protein but differing in the 5' UTR, have been found for this gene.

Interactions
CBX3 has been shown to interact with PIM1, Ki-67, Lamin B receptor, CBX5 and CBX1.

See also
 Heterochromatin protein 1

References

Further reading

External links 
 
 

Transcription factors